Charles William "Dub" McGibbony (October 23, 1915 – March 24, 2008) was an American football player and coach. He played for the Brooklyn Tigers of the National Football League (NFL) for one season, in 1944. McGibbony served as the head football coach and head basketball coach at Arkansas state Teachers College—now known as the University of Central Arkansas—in Conway, Arkansas from 1945 to 1946. He was later an assistant football coach at the University of Arkansas.

Head coaching record

College football

References

External links
 

1915 births
2008 deaths
American football halfbacks
American football quarterbacks
Alabama Crimson Tide football players
Arizona Wildcats football coaches
Arkansas Razorbacks football coaches
Basketball coaches from Arkansas
Brooklyn Tigers players
Central Arkansas Bears basketball coaches
Central Arkansas Bears football coaches
Central Arkansas Bears football players
High school football coaches in Arkansas
People from Pine Bluff, Arkansas
Players of American football from Arkansas